The Major Dhyanchand Hockey Stadium, Lucknow or Major Dhyan Chand Stadium is a field hockey stadium in Lucknow, Uttar Pradesh, India named after Indian hockey player Major Dhyanchand. It is situated in Guru Gobind Singh Sports College's campus. It serves as the home ground for Hockey India League franchise, Uttar Pradesh Wizards.

References

See also
Hockey India League
2013 Hockey India League
Guru Gobind Singh Sports College
Chandgi Ram Sports Complex

Field hockey venues in India
Field hockey in Uttar Pradesh
Sports venues in Lucknow
Monuments and memorials to Dhyan Chand
Year of establishment missing